Berberia is a butterfly genus from the subfamily Satyrinae in the family Nymphalidae. The species in the genus Berberia occur in North Africa.

Species
Berberia abdelkader (Pierret, 1837)
Berberia lambessanus (Staudinger, 1901)

References

Satyrinae of the Western Palearctic

Satyrini
Butterfly genera